The 2020–21 Weber State Wildcats men's basketball team represented Weber State University in the 2020–21 NCAA Division I men's basketball season. The Wildcats, led by 15th-year head coach Randy Rahe, played their home games at the Dee Events Center in Ogden, Utah, as members of the Big Sky Conference. In a season limited due to the ongoing COVID-19 pandemic, they finished the season 17–6, 12–3 in Big Sky play to finish a tie for second place. As the No. 3 seed in the Big Sky tournament, they lost in the quarterfinals to Montana.

Previous season
The Wildcats finished the 2019–20 season 12–20, 8–12 in Big Sky play to finish in a tie for eighth place. As the No. 9 seed in the Big Sky tournament, they lost in the first round to Sacramento State.

Roster

Schedule and results

|-
!colspan=12 style=| Regular season

|-
!colspan=12 style=| Big Sky tournament
|-

|-

Source

References

Weber State Wildcats men's basketball seasons
Weber State Wildcats
Weber State Wildcats men's basketball
Weber State Wildcats men's basketball